The Likum language is a West Manus language spoken by approximately 80 people in western Manus Island, Manus Province of Papua New Guinea. Its speakers also use Nyindrou. Likum is classified as "definitely endangered" by UNESCO's Atlas of the World's Languages in Danger. It has SVO word order.

References

External links 
 Kaipuleohone's Robert Blust collections include written and audio materials Likum

Manus languages
Definitely endangered languages
Endangered Austronesian languages
Languages of Manus Province
Subject–verb–object languages